Current affairs may refer to:

News
 Current Affairs (magazine) a bimonthly American magazine of culture and politics.
 Current affairs (news format), a genre of broadcast journalism
 Current Affairs, former name for Behind the News, an Australian program

Politics
 An approximate synonym for current events
 An approximate synonym for politics

Other uses
 "Current Affairs", a song by Zion I and The Grouch from Heroes in the City of Dope

See also
 A Current Affair (disambiguation)